Planet Punk is an album released by German rock band Die Ärzte on 18 September 1995. According to the band's autobiography, band guitarist Farin Urlaub considers it to be their best album.

Track listing

Personnel
Farin Urlaub – guitar, vocals
Bela Felsenheimer - drums, vocals
Rodrigo González – bass, vocals
Jasmin Tabatabai – additional vocals on 4, backing vocals on 7
Chichi – backing vocals on 7, 12
Heinz Strunk – flute on 7, backing vocals on 11

Charts

Weekly charts

Year-end charts

References

1995 albums
Die Ärzte albums
German-language albums